The Deputy Prime Minister of Malta is the deputy head of government and second-most senior officer in the Government of Malta after the Prime Minister of Malta, being a minister in his own right.

Constitutional functions

Being the deputy to the Prime Minister, the Deputy Prime Minister can take the position of acting Prime Minister when the Prime Minister is temporarily absent.
Eleven people have served as Deputy Prime Minister of Malta since the office was established in 1947. The post did not exist in the period between 1949 and 1971 and was vacant in the period between 2012 and 2013.

List of officeholders
Political parties

See also
Deputy Prime Minister of Malta
Prime Minister of Malta
President of Malta 
Government of Malta
House of Representatives of Malta

Deputy Prime Minister

Malta